Jangali Maharaj (1806–1890), also known as Sadguru Jangali Maharaj or Guru Maharaj, was a Maharashtrian saint who lived in Pune, India, in the late 19th century.  "Jungle" (Jangali) "Resident of forest" (Maharaj) Emperor. A major commercial road in Pune (Jangali Maharaj Road) is named after him.

It is believed that he was born near Solapur Maharashtra in the early 18th century. Very little is known about his early life other than that he was an athlete and participated in the Indian Rebellion of 1857.

He was a very great spiritual guru and had enlightened all the spiritual chakras.

References 

Marathi people
19th-century Hindu religious leaders
1806 births
1890 deaths